Man Maw is a village in Homalin Township, Hkamti District, in the Sagaing Region of northwestern Burma. It is located east of the town of Homalin.

References

External links
Maplandia World Gazetteer

Populated places in Hkamti District
Homalin Township